Herbert Macandrew (ca. 1858 – 15 January 1917) was a New Zealand doctor and medical superintendent of the Seaview Asylum in Hokitika on the West Coast of the South Island.

Macandrew's father was the politician James Macandrew and he was one of four brothers and four sisters. 

He was born in Dunedin and attended Otago Boys High School. He studied medicine at the University of Edinburgh; after graduating in 1883 he worked at an asylum in Shrewsbury. He was assistant medical officer at Seacliff Asylum and from 1887 was medical superintendent at Seaview Asylum in Hokitika for 28 years.

He and his wife had one son and two daughters.

Macandrew died of cancer on 15 January 1917 aged 57 in Hokitika. He is buried in the Hokitika Cemetery.

References

External links 

 Photo of Herbert Macandrew in National Library

1858 births
1917 deaths
Burials at Hokitika Cemetery
People educated at Otago Boys' High School
19th-century New Zealand medical doctors
20th-century New Zealand medical doctors